Baile Ghib is a small Gaeltacht (Irish-speaking area) in County Meath, Ireland. It and one other village, Ráth Chairn, make up the Meath Gaeltacht. The Meath Gaeltacht has 1,591 inhabitants, representing 2% of the total population of Ireland's Gaeltachtaí (plural of Gaeltacht).16% of people living in Baile Ghib and Ráth Chairn speak Irish on a daily basis outside the education system according to the 2016 census. By contrast, the county town of Navan,  from Baile Ghib, has a population of over 30,173.

History

The Baile Ghib Gaeltacht was founded in 1937, when Irish-speaking families were moved from Gaeltachts on the west coast of Ireland under the Land Commission. Baile Ailin (English: Allenstown) was established nearby at the same time as Baile Ghib, but proved less successful, with most of its inhabitants moving away. Each family received a house, 22 acres, farm animals and farm implements in exchange for land and property in their native county. Baile Ghib was eventually given official Gaeltacht status, along with Ráth Chairn, in 1967.

Today, Baile Ghib has a GAA club (Bhulf Tón CLG), a village hall, a shop, a church, and a gaelscoil (primary school).

References 

Gaeltacht places in County Meath
Towns and villages in County Meath